The Sun Bowl Amphiteathtre is an outdoor amphitheatre in Sun City, Arizona owned by Recreation Centers of Sun City, Inc. It hosts numerous concerts, performances and other events geared towards the retirement communities of Sun City.

See also
List of contemporary amphitheatres

External links
Project Overview
Photos from Sun Bowl events

Amphitheaters in the United States
Theatres in Arizona
Buildings and structures in Maricopa County, Arizona